Roadside Heretics is the fifth studio album by South African gothic rock band The Awakening, released in 2002.

Recording
In June 2002 The Awakening recorded its most aggressive album, Roadside Heretics.  Regarding Roadside Heretics, HM Magazine wrote that "Ashton Nyte has a great understanding of the gothic aesthetic. Besides modern day mainstream breakthroughs like Trent Reznor and Marilyn Manson, The Awakening would surely make David Bowie, Peter Murphy, and Lou Reed proud... he can still make us squirm with a sensuous love song like "Cover." Brilliant."

Additional reviews drew attention to the "quieter pieces" of the album such as songs like "My World" as they showcase the strengths of Ashton Nyte in "both vocals and composition."

Track listing
All songs written by Ashton Nyte.
"Roadside heretics"
"Mirror Tricks"
"The Maker"
"Beautiful"
"My World"
"Fallen"
"Angels"
"Away from Home"
"The No-where Mind"
"Tracey-junkie"
"Complexion"
"Cover"

References

The Awakening (band) albums
2002 albums